The Duggan-Cronin Gallery, which is a satellite of the McGregor Museum in Kimberley, South Africa, houses in part the legacy in photographs and ethnographic artefacts of the photographer Alfred Martin Duggan-Cronin. It occupies a former dwelling known as The Lodge. Built in 1889, to a design by the architect Sydney Stent, The Lodge was the residence of John Blades Currey, manager of the London & S.A. Exploration Co. De Beers Consolidated Mines Ltd acquired the extensive property of the London & S.A. Exploration Co  in 1899, including The Lodge, which continued to be used as a residence.

Duggan-Cronin
In the late 1930s De Beers made The Lodge available to A.M. Duggan-Cronin to establish what he called (progressively, at the time) the 'Bantu Gallery'.  Exhibits were arranged by tribe in the various rooms of the house. These were re-arranged in the 1980s to incorporate a more strongly historical narrative, while more concerted work on the Duggan-Cronin collections resulted in a much more substantial display reconfiguration in the early 2000s.

References

Buildings and structures in Kimberley, Northern Cape
Anthropology museums
Ethnographic museums in Africa
Biographical museums in South Africa
Photography museums and galleries in South Africa